Davenport Field at Disharoon Park is a baseball stadium in Charlottesville, Virginia.  It is the home field of the University of Virginia Cavaliers college baseball team.  The stadium has a capacity of ~5,900 and opened in 2002.  The field is named after former Virginia Student Aid Foundation executive director Ted Davenport, and the stadium is named after Les and Ann Disharoon.

Opening Day
On February 16, 2002, the University of Virginia baseball program defeated the Bucknell Bison 10-3 in the first ever contest played at the brand new UVA Baseball Stadium. Virginia opened the door on its new multimillion-dollar facility for the 2002 season.

Renovations
Disharoon Park has been through a series of improvements over its tenure as the home to the Virginia Cavaliers, but none like the upgrades and renovations that have taken place in recent years.

Improvements to the stadium include: a canopied grandstand with 1,500 seats; an additional 500 seats and a grass hillside to provide more seating; six sky boxes for lease by fans and corporate sponsors; stadium lights; new dugouts for the home and visiting teams; an on-site locker room and club house; a new press box, and a new concession area.

Representing a major athletic facility improvement, the University of Virginia installed a new grass playing surface at the then UVA Baseball Field in 1998. The Bermuda grass playing surface - known as Davenport Field - was dedicated on Saturday, April 13, 2002 during Virginia's second contest of a three-game series against the Wake Forest Demon Deacons. Financial backers of the 2002 expansion included novelist John Grisham.

Following the 2005 season, the left field wall was shortened and moved inward to decrease the distance down the line by 17 feet.  The right field was not adjusted as the stadium dimensions became asymmetrical for 2006.

Following the 2006 season, a new scoreboard featuring a video system similar to the ones at the John Paul Jones Arena and Klockner Stadium was installed at Davenport Field.  The right field wall was adjusted in association with the project, resulting in a return to symmetrical field dimensions for 2007.

Prior to the 2010 season, a new set of facilities under the stadium were constructed, including an on-site visitors' clubhouse, umpire room, coaches' office.  A hall of fame dedicated to baseball will also be constructed in the same space.

During the 2010 season, the seating capacity of Davenport Field was progressively increased with the addition of 3 sets of temporary bleachers.  This expanded the facility's capacity from 3,600 to 4,825, with the final addition occurring prior to the school's final ACC series at home versus North Carolina.

Prior to the May 13, 2011, series versus Miami, 249 General Admission seats were added behind the right field wall increasing the stadium's capacity to 5,074.

Prior to the 2013 season, 6 grandstand sections with aluminum bleacher seating were converted to chairback seating, resulting in a reduction of stadium capacity to 4,980.

A new club seating area called the Clubhouse was added to Davenport Field prior to the 2014 season. Located in left-center field, the Clubhouse includes an indoor, climate-controlled area with a cash bar, seating and TVs as well as 65 outdoor chairback seats.

Davenport Field was expanded during the 2017 offseason to include a new grand entry in right field, an extended concourse with permanent chair back seats along the third base line, a field-level club area with seating for up to 140 fans, and new concessions, merchandise, and restroom facilities. The newly renovated stadium includes new areas for player training and development, a new pitching development center, and new offices for the coaches.  The new capacity is approximately 5,900.  Prior to the February 21, 2018 home opener against VMI, the university announced that following a donation, the official stadium name would change to Davenport Field and Disharoon Park.

Expanded scheduling
The new ballpark has enabled Virginia to schedule games against nationally prominent teams that previously would have been played on the road. "This will increase the opportunity for television game coverage," said Craig Littlepage, UVA athletic director. "Adding stadium lighting will allow our team to play or practice at night and thus miss fewer classes. In addition, the facility will become a community asset, offering a potential venue for high school tournaments and adult-league games."

Namesake
The field was named in honor of Thomas "Ted" Edward Davenport, who served the University of Virginia as Executive Director and Secretary/Treasurer of the Virginia Student Aid Foundation (VSAF) from 1958 until 1988. He was a dear friend and avid fan of the university until his death in 2001. A 1953 graduate of the Curry School of Education, Davenport was instrumental in increasing the donations and donors to the annual fund and leading capital funding efforts for the athletics program during his tenure. He served the university in several capacities including head baseball coach and head golf coach.

In 2018, a generous commitment was made by an anonymous donor to name the Virginia baseball stadium Disharoon Park in honor of Leslie B. Disharoon and Ann Merriwether Disharoon. Les and Ann are well-known as long-time and generous supporters of the baseball program. Mrs. Disharoon, who died in 2013, was an enthusiastic Virginia baseball fan. Mr. Disharoon remains an active supporter of the baseball program. He has served as a member of the Virginia Athletics Foundation Board of Trustees, as well as on the boards of various other institutions and foundations.

Milestones and facts

Attendance
In 2013, the Cavaliers ranked 16th among Division I baseball programs in attendance, averaging 3,189 per home game.

See also
 List of NCAA Division I baseball venues
 Virginia Cavaliers

References

External links
 Davenport Field at VirginiaSports.com
 VMDO Architect - Davenport Field mock-ups

College baseball venues in the United States
Sports venues in Virginia
Baseball venues in Virginia
Virginia Cavaliers baseball
Buildings of the University of Virginia
2002 establishments in Virginia
Sports venues completed in 2002